is a district located in Tokushima Prefecture, Japan.

Matsushige is home to Tokushima Airport.

Towns and villages
Aizumi
Itano
Kamiita
Kitajima
Matsushige

Municipal timeline
April 1, 2005 - The towns of Donari and Yoshino merged to form the new city of Awa.

Districts in Tokushima Prefecture